Jusgund is a village in Drass tehsil in Kargil district of the Indian union territory of Ladakh. The village is located 30 kilometres from the district headquarters Kargil.

Demographics
According to the 2011 census of India, Jusgund had 53 households. The literacy rate of Jusgund village is 78.92%. In Jusgund, Male literacy stands at 88.46% while the female literacy rate was 69.68%.

Transport

Road
Jusgund is connected by road to other places in Ladakh and India by the NH 301.

Rail
The nearest major railway stations to Jusgund are Sopore railway station and Srinagar railway station located at a distance of 247 kilometres and 253 kilometres.

Air
The nearest airport is located in Kargil at a distance of 36 kilometres but it is currently non-operational. The next nearest major airport is Leh Airport located at a distance of 243 kilometres.

See also
Ladakh
Kargil
Drass

References

Villages in Drass tehsil